The 1928 Summer Deaflympics, officially known as the 2nd International Silent Games, is an international multi-sport event that was celebrated from 18 to 26 August 1928 in Amsterdam, Netherlands

Participating Countries
The countries who participated in the 1928 Deaflympics were:
 Austria
 Belgium
 Czechoslovakia
 France
 Germany
 Great Britain
 Hungary
 Italy
 Netherlands
 Switzerland

Sports
The following events were included in the 1928 Deaflympics:
 Football

Medal Tables

See also
Deaflympics

References

Deaflympics